In professional wrestling, the Alberta Tag Team Championship was a tag team championship promoted by the Calgary, Alberta, Canada-based professional wrestling promotion Stampede Wrestling in the mid-1950s.

History 
The Alberta Tag Team Championship was created in 1954. The inaugural champions were Bob Mike and Seelie Samara, who defeated Jim Henry and Frank Marconi on 5 March 1954 in what was billed as the final bout of a tournament.

The Alberta Tag Team Championship was one of two tag team championships contested in Stampede Wrestling during the mid-1950s, with the other being the NWA Canadian Tag Team Championship (which was also created in 1954). On several occasions, the same tag team held the two championships concurrently.

The championship was defended exclusively within Calgary, with bouts taking place in the Victoria Pavilion. The championship was frequently defended in two-out-of-three falls matches.

There are two gaps in the recorded lineage of the Alberta Tag Team Championship: from 2 August 1954 to March 1955, and again between 27 May 1955 and 5 April 1956. It is unknown whether the championship continued to be defended and change hands over these periods without a record being maintained or rather whether it was quietly abandoned and subsequently resurrected.

The final champions were John Foti and John Paul Henning, who won the championship on 14 December 1956, and were billed as champions until at least 30 May 1957. The championship was abandoned that year. In February 1958, the NWA International Tag Team Championship was introduced in its place.

Reigns 

|-
|style="background: #aaaaaa;" colspan=9|
|-

|-
|style="background: #aaaaaa;" colspan=9|
|-

|-
|style="background: #aaaaaa;" colspan=9|
|-
|}

References

External links 
The Alberta Tag Team Championship at Wrestling-Titles.com

Canadian professional wrestling championships
Professional wrestling in Alberta
Alberta
Tag team wrestling championships